Bryony Joanne James (born 1970 or 1971) is a professor of Engineering who is currently based at the University of Waikato.

Academic career

After a 1997 PhD titled  'The oxidation reactions of heterogeneous carbon cathodes used in the electrolytic production of aluminium'  at the University of Auckland, James joined the staff, rising to full professor.

Much of her work involves engineering properties of food. In 2017 James, Dr Gant, Associate Professor MJ Hautus and Professor EA Foegeding were awarded a Marsden Fund grant for a study titled Why do texturally complex foods lead us to eat less?

In 2020, Bryony was appointed Deputy Vice-Chancellor (Research) at the University of Waikato.

Selected works 
 James, Bryony J., Yan Jing, and Xiao Dong Chen. "Membrane fouling during filtration of milk––a microstructural study." Journal of Food Engineering 60, no. 4 (2003): 431–437.
 Lee, Brendan J., Armando G. McDonald, and Bryony James. "Influence of fiber length on the mechanical properties of wood-fiber/polypropylene prepreg sheets." Materials research innovations 4, no. 2-3 (2001): 97–103.
 Patel, Krishal, Colin S. Doyle, Daisuke Yonekura, and Bryony J. James. "Effect of surface roughness parameters on thermally sprayed PEEK coatings." Surface and Coatings Technology 204, no. 21-22 (2010): 3567–3572.
 James, Bryony J., and Bronwen G. Smith. "Surface structure and composition of fresh and bloomed chocolate analysed using X-ray photoelectron spectroscopy, cryo-scanning electron microscopy and environmental scanning electron microscopy." LWT-Food Science and Technology 42, no. 5 (2009): 929–937.
 Lynne, Bridget Y., Kathleen A. Campbell, Bryony J. James, Patrick RL Browne, and Joseph Moore. "Tracking crystallinity in siliceous hot-spring deposits." American Journal of Science 307, no. 3 (2007): 612–641.

References

Living people
Academic staff of the University of Waikato
New Zealand women academics
University of Auckland alumni
Academic staff of the University of Auckland
New Zealand engineers
Year of birth missing (living people)
21st-century New Zealand women writers
Recipients of Marsden grants